List of tallest observation towers in the United States, up to the first ten structures

References

External links
http://en.structurae.de/structures/data/index.cfm?ID=s0000341

observation towers
Observation